"Catch the Moon" is a song written and recorded by Stefan Andersson for his 1992 debut album Emperor's Day. It was released as a single and become the third most successful  Trackslistan hit of 1992.

In May 2005, a live version was recorded inside the Annedal Church and released on Andersson's album, En främlings hus.

Charts

References

1992 singles
1992 songs
English-language Swedish songs
Songs written by Stefan Andersson (singer)